Geoff Hampson (born 1968) is a Canadian professional bridge player. Hampson is from Toronto and the son of Sharon Hampson (née Trostin) of "Sharon Lois and Bram" and American folk singer Joe Hampson.

Bridge accomplishments

Awards

 Fishbein Trophy (1) 2005
 Herman Trophy (1) 2003
 Mott-Smith Trophy (1) 2003

Wins

 North American Bridge Championships (17)
 von Zedtwitz Life Master Pairs (1) 1998 
 Lebhar IMP Pairs (1) 2006 
 Fast Open Pairs (2) 2007, 2011 
 Rockwell Mixed Pairs (1) 1994 
 Silodor Open Pairs (2) 1997, 2014 
 Wernher Open Pairs (1) 2003 
 Nail Life Master Open Pairs (1) 2002 
 Jacoby Open Swiss Teams (1) 2010 
 Roth Open Swiss Teams (1) 2012 
 Keohane North American Swiss Teams (1) 1992 
 Reisinger (1) 2003 
 Roth Open Swiss Teams (1) 2007 
 Spingold (2) 2005, 2010 
Mitchell Board-a-Match Teams (1) 2018

Runners-up

 North American Bridge Championships
 von Zedtwitz Life Master Pairs (1) 2008 
 Wernher Open Pairs (2) 1992, 2002 
 Blue Ribbon Pairs (2) 2003, 2012 
 Grand National Teams (1) 1996 
 Jacoby Open Swiss Teams (1) 2003 
 Vanderbilt (3) 2007, 2009, 2012 
 Keohane North American Swiss Teams (1) 2002

Notes

External links
 

1968 births
Living people
Canadian contract bridge players
Sportspeople from Toronto
Date of birth missing (living people)
Place of birth missing (living people)